Mira Records was a record label founded in 1965 by former Vee-Jay Records executive Randy Wood.  He also operated concurrently the Mirwood and  Surrey labels. The label issued hit records by The Leaves and The Forum.  It folded in 1968.

References

External links
 Singles discography from Global Dog Productions
 Album discography from BSN Pubs

Defunct record labels of the United States